Maurice Privat (1889–1949) was a French author. He was an advisor to Pierre Laval, who served as the French Prime Minister from 1942 to 1944.

Works

References

1889 births
1949 deaths
Writers from Paris
French biographers